Acrae or Akrai was a town of ancient Aetolia, on the road from Metapa to Conope. Stephanus of Byzantium erroneously calls it an Acarnanian town.

Its site is located the acropolis of modern Pappadates.

References

Populated places in ancient Aetolia
Former populated places in Greece